The 1991 Torneo Internazionale Femminile di Palermo was a women's tennis tournament played on outdoor clay courts at the Country Time Club in Palermo, Italy that was part of the Tier V category of the 1991 WTA Tour. It was the fourth edition of the tournament and was held from 8 July until 14 July 1991. Unseeded Mary Pierce won the singles title and earned $13,500 first-prize money.

Finals

Singles
 Mary Pierce defeated  Sandra Cecchini 6–0, 6–3
 It was Pierce's first singles title of her career.

Doubles
 Mary Pierce /  Petra Langrová defeated  Laura Garrone /  Mercedes Paz 6–3, 6–7(5–7), 6–3

References

External links
 ITF tournament edition details
 Tournament draws

Internazionali Femminili di Palermo
Internazionali Femminili di Palermo
1991 in Italian women's sport
Torneo